This is a list of persons who held the offices of chairman, vice chairman and deputy chairman of the London County Council. All three offices existed from 1889 to 1965.

Background
The chairmanship and vice chairmanship were statutory offices created by the Local Government Act 1888. Both of these positions were generally filled by members of the majority party. The chairman chaired meetings of the council, and was the county's civic leader, filling a similar role to the mayor of a borough or city. The vice chairman performed these functions in his or her absence.

As part of the celebrations of the silver jubilee of George V in 1935 it was announced that the chairman would in future be entitled to use the style "right honourable", an honour already enjoyed by the Lord Mayor of London.

The council's standing orders also provided for the post of deputy chairman. This was initially a salaried position created to supervise the administration of the local authority. In 1894 the Royal Commission on the Amalgamation of the City and County of London strongly recommended that a clerk be appointed, independent of the parties on the council, as was the practice in municipal boroughs. A county clerk was duly appointed in 1895, and the deputy chairmanship became ceremonial. The office was filled by nominees of the opposition party on the council.

On 1 April 1965 the London County Council was abolished, with its successor authority being the Greater London Council.

Regalia
The chairman had no badge of office until 1927. In 1909 the council had decided that no badge or device should be worn by the chairman. By 1926 the number of formal occasions attended by the chairman had increased, and it was felt that he was at a distinct disadvantage due to not having a distinguishing mark to indicate his office. In 1927 Major Lewis-Barned, councillor for South Paddington, agreed to cover the cost of a badge. The badge was made by an instructor at the Central School of Arts and Crafts and featured the council's coat of arms within an oval of London Pride. The badge was worn on a ribbon in a distinctive barry wavy argent and azure pattern derived from the arms. In 1950 similar, but smaller, badges were acquired for the use of the vice and deputy chairmen.

1889–1899

1899–1909

1909–1919

1919–1929

1929–1939

1939–1949

1949–1959

1959–1965

Note t:  Stamp resigned unexpectedly on 5 October 1963 when he came under investigation by the Director of Public Prosecutions. On 11 October 1963 Wicks was elected chairman in his place, and his place as vice chairman was filled by Stillman. Stamp was eventually cleared of any wrongdoing in December 1963.

References

See also
List of heads of London government

Members of London County Council
London County Council
London County Council
London County Council